John Davies is a New Zealand Paralympian who competed in lawn bowls. At the 1988 Summer Paralympics, he won a bronze medal in the pairs LB2 event.

References

External links 
 
 

Year of birth missing (living people)
New Zealand male bowls players
Lawn bowls players at the 1988 Summer Paralympics
Paralympic bronze medalists for New Zealand
Medalists at the 1988 Summer Paralympics
Paralympic medalists in lawn bowls
Living people